Barbara Tuttle Snelling (née Weil; March 22, 1928November 2, 2015) served as the 78th lieutenant governor of Vermont from 1993 to 1997. She suffered a cerebral hemorrhage in 1996 while campaigning for governor. She was elected to the Vermont State Senate in 1998, where she served until she suffered a second stroke; she resigned in 2002.

Life and career
Snelling was born Barbara Tuttle Weil in 1928 in Fall River, Massachusetts, the daughter of Hazel (née Russell) and The Reverend F. Taylor Weil. She attended Smith College for two years before transferring to Radcliffe College, from which she received her Bachelor of Arts degree Magna Cum Laude in 1950.

She served as chair of the Shelburne School Board; as Founding Chair of Champlain Valley Union High School Board. She was member of the State Board of Education; President of the Vermont State School Boards Association; Vermont Commission on Alcohol and Drug Rehabilitation; Chair of the Chittenden County United Way.

She was a founding trustee of the Vermont Community Foundation; a trustee of Champlain College and Radcliffe College. She was a trustee of the Shelburne Museum.

She was Vice President of the University of Vermont and later was President of Snelling and Kolb, a national fundraising consulting firm focused of development work for educational institutions.

She was married to Richard Snelling, a long-serving governor of Vermont.  Their children included Jacqueline, Mark, Andrew, and Diane, who was appointed to Snelling's seat in the State Senate.

Snelling died at her home in South Burlington, Vermont on November 2, 2015.

See also
List of female lieutenant governors in the United States

Notes

Lieutenant Governors of Vermont
Republican Party Vermont state senators
First Ladies and Gentlemen of Vermont
Radcliffe College alumni
School board members in Vermont
Women state legislators in Vermont
People from Fall River, Massachusetts
People from Shelburne, Vermont
1928 births
2015 deaths
Snelling family